"Our Last Night" is the second single from the 2005 Better Than Ezra studio album, Before the Robots, written by lead vocalist, Kevin Griffin. It was released as a commercial single in 2005.

Reception
"Our Last Night" reached No. 28 on the Billboard Adult Top 40 chart in 2005.

Chart performance

References

2005 singles
Better Than Ezra songs
Songs written by Kevin Griffin
2005 songs
Artemis Records singles